Listed below are the dates and results for the 2006 FIFA World Cup qualification rounds for South America.  10 teams took part, all in a single group.  The rules were very simple: the teams would play against each other in a home-and-away basis, with the four teams with most points qualifying to the 2006 FIFA World Cup. The fifth ranked team would have to play-off against the best team from Oceania, with the winner of this play-off also qualifying. For the first time, defending champions Brazil was required to go through the qualifying process and did not automatically qualify for the tournament.

Standings

Brazil, Argentina, Ecuador and Paraguay qualified for the 2006 FIFA World Cup.
Uruguay advanced to the CONMEBOL/OFC play-off.

Results

Round 1

Round 2

Round 3

Round 4

Round 5

Round 6

Round 7

Round 8

Round 9

Round 10

Round 11

Round 12

Round 13

Round 14

Round 15

Round 16

Round 17

Round 18

Inter-confederation play-offs

The fifth-placed team then played the winner of the OFC qualifying group, Australia, in a home-and-away play-off. The winner of this play-off qualified for the 2006 FIFA World Cup finals.

Qualified teams
The following four teams from CONMEBOL qualified for the final tournament.

1 Bold indicates champions for that year. Italic indicates hosts for that year.

Goalscorers
There were 236 goals scored in 92 matches (including 2 international play-offs), for an average of 2.57 goals per match.
10 goals

 Ronaldo

7 goals

 Hernán Crespo
 José Cardozo
 Jefferson Farfán

6 goals

 Adriano
 Diego Forlán
 Ruberth Morán

5 goals

 Joaquín Botero
 José Alfredo Castillo
 Kaká
 Agustín Delgado
 Edison Méndez
 Javier Chevantón

4 goals

 Ronaldinho
 Juan Pablo Ángel
 Roque Santa Cruz
 Nolberto Solano
 Juan Arango

3 goals

 Pablo Aimar
 Luciano Figueroa
 Juan Román Riquelme
 Mauricio Pinilla
 Tressor Moreno
 Luis Gabriel Rey
 Antonio Valencia
 Carlos Gamarra
 Carlos Humberto Paredes
 Marcelo Zalayeta
 Giancarlo Maldonado

2 goals

 Juan Pablo Sorín
 Luis Cristaldo
 Limberg Gutiérrez
 Roberto Carlos
 Robinho
 Luis Fuentes
 Luis Antonio Jiménez
 Milovan Mirošević
 Reinaldo Navia
 Freddy Grisales
 Frankie Oviedo
 Víctor Pacheco
 John Restrepo
 Elkin Soto
 Marlon Ayoví
 Ulises de la Cruz
 Paolo Guerrero
 Andrés Mendoza
 Jorge Soto
 Carlos Bueno
 José Torrealba
 Gabriel Urdaneta

1 goal

 Fabricio Coloccini
 Andrés D'Alessandro
 César Delgado
 Luciano Galletti
 Kily González
 Lucho González
 Mauro Rosales
 Javier Saviola
 Javier Zanetti
 Julio César Baldivieso
 Gonzalo Galindo
 Roger Suárez
 Doyle Vaca
 Joselito Vaca
 Emerson
 Juan
 Luís Fabiano
 Juninho
 Rivaldo
 Zé Roberto
 Mark González
 Sebastián González
 Rodrigo Meléndez
 Arturo Norambuena
 Ricardo Francisco Rojas
 Marcelo Salas
 Moisés Villarroel
 Martín Arzuaga
 Sergio Herrera
 Edixon Perea Valencia
 Mario Yepes
 Giovanny Espinoza
 Iván Kaviedes
 Christian Lara
 Franklin Salas
 Carlos Tenorio
 Julio César Cáceres
 Diego Gavilán
 Gustavo Morínigo
 Jorge Martín Núñez
 Nelson Valdez
 Salvador Cabañas
 Santiago Acasiete
 Claudio Pizarro
 Gustavo Vassallo
 Nelson Abeijon
 Paolo Montero
 Álvaro Recoba
 Mario Regueiro
 Cristian Rodríguez
 Darío Rodríguez
 Adrián Romero
 Héctor González
 José Manuel Rey
 Leonel Vielma

1 own goal

 Hermán Solíz (against Ecuador)
 Gilberto Silva (against Uruguay)
 Luis Guadalupe (against Argentina)
 Alejandro Cichero (against Bolivia)
 José Manuel Rey (against Argentina)

References

See also
2010 FIFA World Cup qualification (CONMEBOL)
2002 FIFA World Cup qualification (CONMEBOL)

CONMEBOL
FIFA World Cup qualification (CONMEBOL)
World
World
World